Wendy Patricia Acosta Salas (born 19 December 1989) is a Costa Rican footballer who plays as a midfielder for Herediano FF and the Costa Rica women's national football team.

Career

University of Costa Rica
Acosta attended the University of Costa Rica.

International
On 28 April 2010, Acosta made her international debut against Honduras. On 7 October 2011, she scored her first ever international goal against El Salvador. In the following matches against Honduras and Guatemala, she again scored a goal in each match. Then on 22 January 2012, she scored a brace against Haiti. On 7 March, she scored a hat-trick against Belize, with goals in the twenty-sixth, forty-fourth and sixty-fifth minute during a match in which Costa Rica won 14–0. She would continue her scoring, as she found the net in consecutive matches against El Salvador and Panama. 

On 16 March 2013, Acosta scored twice in a match against Nicaragua. There she found the net in the first half of the match, in the fourteenth and twentieth minute. Costa Rica won that match 4–0. She again scored in a 6–1 victory for Costa Rica against Martinique, finding the net in the thirty-second minute before she was substituted for Carol Sanchez in the sixty-second minute. Through victory in that match, Costa Rica was "one match away from" the 2015 FIFA Women's World Cup. On 5 March 2015, Acosta scored a single goal against Bosnia and Herzegovina, which helped Costa Rica win a match in the Istria Cup.

Club
In 2015, Acosta was invited for a trial by Swedish club AIK.

After scoring a goal, Acosta "always [points] to the sky" to remember her father, who died due to a heart ailment in 2011. She has also said that she plays football because her "dad played".

Honours 
Costa Rica
Winner
 Central American Games: 2013

References

External links
 
 Profile  at Fedefutbol
 

1989 births
Living people
Women's association football midfielders
Costa Rican women's footballers
People from San José Province
Costa Rica women's international footballers
2015 FIFA Women's World Cup players
Pan American Games competitors for Costa Rica
Footballers at the 2011 Pan American Games
Footballers at the 2015 Pan American Games
Central American Games gold medalists for Costa Rica
Central American Games medalists in football
VCU Rams women's soccer players
Costa Rican expatriate footballers
Costa Rican expatriate sportspeople in the United States
Expatriate women's soccer players in the United States
Costa Rican expatriate sportspeople in Spain
Expatriate women's footballers in Spain